Life in a Scotch Sitting Room, Vol. 2 is an album by Ivor Cutler, originally released in 1978. It was recorded live in Cutler's native Glasgow, and tells stories from his childhood growing up in a middle-class family around the time of the Great Depression.

The poems and stories from the album were also published as a book in 1984.

The sleeve notes include the following:

"Recorded by Pete Shipton of Radio Clyde at the 3rd Eye Centre, Sauchiehall Street, Glasgow, on the 7th, 8th, 9th of July, 1977.

Edited by Seán Murphy & Pat Stapely, and Master Record cut by Mick Webb.

All tracks registered with P.R.S and M.C.P.S and ©1977 Ivor Cutler.

Sleeve front - Helen Oxenbury ©1977. Lettering - Phyllis April King.

Deep gratitude to Al Clark and Seán Murphy."

Episodes 1 and 3 were tracks on the 1974 album Dandruff, although there is a discrepancy in the title shown for one of the tracks on that album compared with the track titles on Life in a Scotch Sitting Room, Vol.2. Four other episodes in total were previously recorded on Velvet Donkey and Jammy Smears.

Track listing
(All tracks written by Ivor Cutler)
Side one
 "Episode 2" – 4:55
 "Episode 3" – 3:45
 "Episode 9" – 3:40
 "Jungle Tip: Owl" – 0:44
 "Episode 1" – 3:12
 "Episode 11" – 4:02
 "Jungle Tip: Lion" – 0:45
 "Episode 5" – 3:13
 "Episode 14" – 3:53
Side two
 "Episode 7" – 3:54
 "Episode 12" – 4:10
 "Jungle Tip: Leopard" – 0:41
 "Episode 8" – 3:52
 "Episode 6" – 2:47
 "Episode 4" – 3:44
 "Jungle Tip: Boa" – 0:31
 "Episode 13" – 5:22
 "Episode 0" – 0:00

References

Ivor Cutler albums
1978 live albums
Harvest Records live albums